Since Kosovo's declaration of independence from Serbia (enacted on 17 February 2008), international recognition of Kosovo has been mixed, and the international community continues to be divided on the issue. The Republic of Kosovo is member of some international intergovernmental and international non-governmental organisations.

Membership in international intergovernmental organizations 
The Republic of Kosovo, as an independent state, is a member of 10 and an observer of 1 international intergovernmental organization. The Republic of Kosovo has formally applied for membership in 4 more international intergovernmental organizations.

Kosovo, under the designation United Nations Interim Administration Mission in Kosovo (UNMIK), or Kosovo*, is a member of 6 and an observer of 1 international intergovernmental organizations.

Intergovernmental organisations do not themselves diplomatically recognise any state; their member states do so individually. However, depending on the intergovernmental organisation's rules of internal governance and the positions of their member states, they may express positive or negative opinions as to declarations of independence, or choose to offer or withhold membership to a partially recognised state.

<div 10px; ">

Membership in international non-governmental organisations

International conventions, treaties, and agreements

Future membership applications 
In 2012, according to the Mena Report Kosovo has applied to become a member of the Organisation of Islamic Cooperation (OIC), but the government of Kosovo neither confirm nor deny this news. Ekmeleddin İhsanoğlu, Secretary-General of the OIC invited Kosovo to become a full member of the OIC.

In 2013, Enver Hoxhaj, Kosovo's Minister of Foreign Affairs, has stated that the country is considering making applications for membership in three United Nations specialized agencies in the first half of 2013, and that an application for membership of the Council of Europe in 2014 is being prepared.

In 2014, Kosovo's Deputy Prime and Minister of Foreign Affairs, Hashim Thaçi, reiterated the state's desire to join in December 2014. Kosovo's Foreign Minister Hoxhaj has said that Kosovo's goal is to be a full UN member state by 2020 and NATO member state by 2022.

In 2015, Kosovo's Ministry of Trade and Industry is also preparing a membership application for the World Trade Organization.  Joining NATO's Partnership for Peace is a priority of the government.

In 2016, Albanian Minister of Foreign Affairs, Ditmir Bushati, said that Kosovo will be member of the Organization for Security and Co-operation in Europe (OSCE) and Adriatic Charter.

The Assembly of Kosovo has been an observer member of the Parliamentary Assembly of the Council of Europe since January 2016. In February 2017, Kosovo's President, Hashim Thaçi, said that Kosovo will apply for membership in the Council of Europe and UNESCO in 2017. Kosovo formally applied for membership of the Council of Europe in May 2022.

Kosovo formally applied for European Union candidate status on 15 December 2022.

Unsuccessful application

See also
Foreign relations of Kosovo
International recognition of Kosovo
Membership of Kosovo in international sports federations
Kosovo precedent

References

 
Independence of Kosovo